{
  "type": "FeatureCollection",
  "features": [
    {
      "type": "Feature",
      "properties": {},
      "geometry": {
        "type": "Point",
        "coordinates": [
          45.508203650853886,
          37.84685557408342
        ]
      }
    }
  ]
}

Shahi Island, which literally translate to Royal Island is the largest island in Urmia Lake, East Azerbaijan Province in Iran. Shahi Island is 23,000 hectares and is located in eastern part of the lake. The island is the only inhabited island in Lake Urmia, with seven villages: Burachalu, Ghebchagh, Teymurlu, and Bahramabad. These villages were located on the shores of the island. However the water level in the lake has been falling, and the "island" is now connected to the mainland from its eastern side and it forms a peninsula.

The Shahi island is a rural district (dehestan) in Osku County.

Mongol ruler
In 1265 Hulagu Khan, the Mongol conqueror of Bagdad, was buried in a mountain (or castle) in the island supposedly with all of his wealth. His tomb has still not been uncovered.

Name change
After Iranian revolution on 1979, the revolutionaries changed the name of the island to Eslami Island (Jazireh-ye-Eslami).

References

Islands of Iran
Osku County
Lake islands of Iran